Ivić or Ivic (Cyrillic script: Ивић) is a South Slavic surname and a masculine given name. It may refer to:

Surname
Frank Ivic, U.S. soccer defender
Ilija Ivić (born 1971), retired Serbian footballer and sports director
Ilija Ivić (born 1991), Croatian footballer
Milka Ivić
Miloš Ivić (born 1985), Serbian footballer
Pavle Ivić (1924–1999), leading South Slavic and general dialectologist and phonologist
Tomislav Ivić (1933–2011), former Croatian football manager
Vladimir Ivić (born 1977), Serbian footballer

Given name
Ivić Pašalić (born 1960), Croatian right-wing politician

See also
Venezuelan Institute for Scientific Research, known as IVIC (Instituto Venezolano de Investigaciones Científicas)

Croatian surnames
Serbian surnames